Adriaan Johan Louis Katte (June 24, 1900 – June 4, 1991) was a Dutch field hockey player who competed in the 1928 Summer Olympics.

He was a member of the Dutch field hockey team, which won the silver medal. He played all four matches as goalkeeper.

External links
 
profile

1900 births
1991 deaths
Dutch male field hockey players
Olympic field hockey players of the Netherlands
Field hockey players at the 1928 Summer Olympics
Olympic silver medalists for the Netherlands
Field hockey players from Amsterdam
Olympic medalists in field hockey
Medalists at the 1928 Summer Olympics
20th-century Dutch people